Citibank Korea is a South Korean subsidiary of Citigroup.

Citibank Korea was named the worst bank in terms of consumer complaints by the Financial Supervisory Service (FSS) in 2015.

History
It was founded as KorAm Bank in 1983, which was acquired by Citibank in 2003.

Branches
Citibank Korea operates ATMs in all of its 134 branches, which accept most international cards. As of 2017, Citibank Korea is aiming to shrink its branch network from 134 to 32 in the country.

Products & Services
Citibank Korea offers consumers and institutions a range of financial products and services, including consumer banking. The company also offers credit cards in Korea.

See also

 List of banks in South Korea

References

External links
 Citibank Korea

Citigroup
Banks of South Korea